Fire (stylized "fiRe") is the fifth album released by Swedish group Hedningarna, translated to "The Heathens" for the international market. It is a compilation album put together to introduce the group outside Sweden, containing tracks from the albums Kaksi! and Tra.

Track listing

References

1996 albums
Hedningarna albums
Silence Records albums